"This Is Nigeria" is a song by Nigerian rapper Falz, released on 25 May 2018. It is a cover of Childish Gambino's "This Is America". Falz's father Femi Falana performed background vocals on the track.
"This Is Nigeria" addresses a number of societal issues prevalent in Nigeria, including SARS brutality, codeine abuse and unrestrained killings. The music video for "This Is Nigeria" runs for a total of three minutes and 43 seconds. It was directed by Prodigeezy and produced by Wande Thomas.

Composition 
According to Falz, the song "addresses numerous political and social ills" and is an attempt "to spark a reaction in the positive direction". The video highlights Nigeria's issues with violence, political corruption, policing and organized religion.

Music video 
The accompanying music video for "This Is Nigeria" was directed by Prodigeezy. Shot in an empty warehouse, the video depicts a Fulani man committing murder, Chibok/Dapchi girls dancing, young men getting high off codeine and undergraduate students being assaulted by the Special Anti-Robbery Squad.

The music video has received over 20 million views on YouTube. American rapper Sean Combs uploaded the music video onto his Instagram page and captioned it with the hashtag "#Nigeria LETS GO!".

Critical reception 
In a video interview with Hello Nigeria, Falz discussed the inspiration behind the video. On June 5, 2018, the Muslim Rights Concern demanded that Falz withdraw the music video or face legal action. He was also asked to apologise for using women wearing hijab while dancing Shaku Shaku. This triggered a viral outrage on social media. Nigerian Twitter users showed support for the video and also advised the rapper not to take down the video. Falz's management later released a statement stating that the music video will not be taken down.

Reference 

2018 songs
Internet memes
Nigerian hip hop songs
Protest songs
Songs about Nigeria
Political rap songs
Songs about violence
2018 singles